Ivylyn Lee Girardeau (October 16, 1900 — September 11, 1987) was an American medical doctor and missionary in India and Pakistan.

Early life
Ivylyn Lee Girardeau was from Thomaston, Georgia, the daughter of John Bohun Girardeau and Emma Trice Girardeau.

Ivylyn Girardeau attended Agnes Scott College, graduating in 1922, and earned her medical degree in 1931, at Tulane University.

Career
Girardeau traveled to India with sponsorship from the Woman's Union Missionary Society (WUMS). She learned to speak Hindi and Urdu. From 1933 to 1945 she ran a fifty-bed facility, the Mary Ackerman Hoyt Memorial Hospital in Jhansi, mainly providing obstetric care.

In the United States, Girardeau served her internship at the Women and Children's Hospital in Boston. When she was in the United States on extended furloughs in the 1940s and 1950s, she toured and gave lectures about her work at churches and for civic clubs. "It is the most fascinating country in the world — and potentially one of the most powerful or dangerous," she told Atlanta Constitution readers in 1945. At age 72, she went to Pakistan and India again, as a medical relief worker. She was a pediatrician in Thomaston, and on the original staff of the Upson Regional Medical Hospital.

Personal life and legacy
Ivylyn Girardeau died in 1987, aged 86 years. Her gravesite is in Upson County.

Girardeau House, a Christian orphanage and school in Uganda, is named for Ivylyn Girardeau. There are two folders of papers related to Ivylyn Girardeau's work in the Records of the Woman's Union Missionary Society, at the Billy Graham Center in Wheaton, Illinois.

References

External links
 

1900 births
1987 deaths
American Christian missionaries
Female Christian missionaries
20th-century American physicians
People from Thomaston, Georgia
Agnes Scott College alumni
Tulane University alumni
20th-century American women physicians
Medical missionaries
Christian missionaries in India
Christian missionaries in Pakistan